Caroline Wozniacki defeated Venus Williams in the final, 6–4, 6–4 to win the singles tennis title at the 2017 WTA Finals. Williams became the oldest player to reach the final. Wozniacki also ended a seven-match losing streak to Williams with the win.

Dominika Cibulková was the defending champion, but failed to qualify this year. 
	
The top seven seeds all had the chance to attain the year-end world No. 1 ranking. Newly crowned No. 1 Simona Halep secured the position after Karolína Plíšková lost in the semifinals.

Caroline Garcia, Jeļena Ostapenko, and Elina Svitolina made their debuts in the event.

Seeds

Alternates

Draw

Finals

Red group

White group

Standings are determined by: 1. number of wins; 2. number of matches; 3. in two-player ties, head-to-head records; 4. in three-player ties, (a) percentage of sets won (head-to-head records if two players remain tied), then (b) percentage of games won (head-to-head records if two players remain tied), then (c) WTA rankings.

References

External Links
Main Draw

2017 Singles
Finals